Karol Marcinkowski (23 June 1800 in Posen, Kingdom of Prussia, today Poznań in Poland–6 November 1846) was a Polish physician, social activist in the Greater Poland region (also called the Grand Duchy of Posen), supporter of the basic education (Praca organiczna) programmes, organizer of the Scientific Help Society (Towarzystwo Pomocy Naukowej) and the Poznań Bazar (Bazar Poznański) - the Polish mall in Poznań that included a hotel, meeting rooms, crafts and shops.

Membership in organizations 
 Scientific Help Society for the Youth of the Grand Duchy of Poznań (est.1841), Towarzystwo Naukowej Pomocy dla Młodzieży Wielkiego Księstwa Poznańskiego - scholarship for poor youth.

Schools named after Marcinkowski 

 Poznan University of Medical Sciences (Uniwersytet Medyczny im. Karola Marcinkowskiego w Poznaniu)
 Karol Marcinkowski 1st High School in Poznań (I Liceum Ogólnokształcące im. Karola Marcinkowskiego w Poznaniu)

References 

 Witold Jakóbczyk, Przetrwać nad Wartą 1815-1914, Dzieje narodu i państwa polskiego, vol. III-55, Krajowa Agencja Wydawnicza, Warszawa 1989

1800 births
1846 deaths
Physicians from Poznań
Politicians from Poznań
19th-century Polish physicians
People from the Grand Duchy of Posen
November Uprising participants
Recipients of the Virtuti Militari
Poles - political prisoners in the Prussian partition